"Breakdown Dead Ahead" is a 1980 song recorded by Boz Scaggs, and composed by Scaggs and David Foster. It was the lead single of two released from Scaggs' album Middle Man.

During May, the song reached number 15 on the US Billboard Hot 100 and number 12 on the Cash Box Top 100. The song was a bigger hit in Canada, where it spent two weeks at number eight on the Pop chart.

Charts

Weekly charts

Year-end charts

Personnel
Rick Marotta – drums
Boz Scaggs – lead vocals, guitar
David Foster – acoustic piano
Don Grolnick – electric piano
Lenny Castro – percussion
David Hungate – bass
Steve Lukather – additional guitars, guitar solo
Ray Parker Jr. – guitar
Paulette K Brown – background vocals
Venetta Fields – background vocals
Bill Thedford  – background vocals

References

External links
 

1980 singles
Boz Scaggs songs
Songs written by David Foster
Songs written by Boz Scaggs
1980 songs
Columbia Records singles